Shana (Shanaa) is a rural locality (an ulus) in Selenginsky District, Republic of Buryatia, Russia. The population was 267 as of 2010. There are 5 streets.

Geography 
Shana is located 53 km southwest of Gusinoozyorsk (the district's administrative centre) by road. Selenduma is the nearest rural locality.

References 

Rural localities in Selenginsky District